Start Breaking My Heart is the debut studio album by Canadian musician Dan Snaith, released under the moniker Manitoba on March 27, 2001, by The Leaf Label.

The album received positive reviews and was re-released in 2006 by Domino Recording Company after Snaith started performing under the new moniker Caribou. The styles and themes of the album have been compared to those of Boards of Canada, Four Tet, and Aphex Twin.

In 2017, Pitchfork placed the album at number 40 on its list of "The 50 Best IDM Albums of All Time".

Track listing

Personnel
Credits adapted from liner notes.
 Dan Snaith – writing, production
 Jay Burnett – mastering
 Ben Dunbar – photography
 EkhornFross – design

References

External links
 Start Breaking My Heart at official Caribou website
 

2001 albums
Dan Snaith albums
Domino Recording Company albums
The Leaf Label albums